Vissinto Ayi d'Almeida is the Ambassador Extraordinary and Plenipotentiary of the Republic of Benin to the Russian Federation.

See also 
 Embassy of Benin in Moscow

References 

Beninese diplomats
Year of birth missing (living people)
Living people
Ambassadors of Benin to Russia